Ek Hi Raasta may refer to:

Ek Hi Raasta (1939 film), a 1939 Hindi social film
Ek Hi Raasta (1956 film), a 1956 family-drama Indian Hindi film
Ek Hi Raasta (1977 film), a 1977 Hindi drama film
Ek Hi Raasta (1993 film), a 1993 Bollywood action film
Ek Hi Raasta: The Power, the title of the Hindi dub of the 2009 Telugu film Ek Niranjan